WJJM (1490 kHz, "Fox Sports 1490 Lewisburg") is an AM radio station broadcasting a sports format. Licensed to Lewisburg, Tennessee, United States, the station is currently owned by WJJM, Inc. and is affiliated with Fox Sports Radio. WJJM supplements Fox Sports Radio programming with local high school sports, produced in tandem with WJJM-FM; both stations share local news and information programming.

References

External links

Sports radio stations in the United States
JJM
Marshall County, Tennessee